Parliamentary elections were held in Bolivia in May 1942 to elect members of the National Congress.

Results

See also
Bolivian National Congress, 1942–1944

References

Elections in Bolivia
Bolivia
Legislative election
Election and referendum articles with incomplete results